The Willy–Nicky correspondence was a series of messages (letters and telegrams) relayed between Wilhelm II, German Emperor, and Nicholas II, Emperor of All Russia during the first months of the First World War.

Context and background
Wilhelm II and Nicholas II were third cousins (both were great-great-grandsons of Paul I of Russia) as well as being second cousins once removed (both were descended from Frederick William III of Prussia) and Wilhelm was a first cousin of Nicholas's wife, Alix of Hesse and the eldest grandson of Queen Victoria. Nicholas was a grandson of King Christian IX of Denmark and a nephew of Queen Alexandra, consort of King Edward VII, as his mother, the Empress Maria Fedorovna, was the former Princess Dagmar of Denmark. 

The two emperors corresponded in English and were accustomed to calling each other "Willy" and "Nicky" but would use their counterparts' formal names in formal communications.

Letters
The Willy-Nicky letters consist of 75 messages Wilhelm sent to Nicholas between 8 November 1894 (Letter I) and 26 March 1914 (Letter LXXV). The majority were sent from Berlin or the Neues Palais in Potsdam, and others from places as diverse as Rominten, Coburg, Letzlingen, Wilhelmshöhe, Kiel, Posen, Pillau, Gaeta, Corfu (where Wilhelm had a summer retreat), Stamboul, and Damascus. Discovered in the Russian archives in Petrograd, they were transcribed by the Russian-American journalist Isaac Don Levine and published in 1920 as Letters from the Kaiser to the Czar: Copied from government archives in Petrograd unpublished before 1920 (New York: Frederick A. Stokes, 1920).

Telegrams
The Willy-Nicky telegrams consist of a series of ten messages wired between Wilhelm and Nicholas on 29, 30 and 31 July and 1 August 1914. Their source is The German White Book, a pamphlet of official documents published to justify the German government's position after the outbreak of war. The term "Willy-Nicky Telegrams" is derived from The Willy-Nicky Correspondence, the title of a book by Herman Bernstein published in 1918 which revealed the personal telegraphic correspondence between the two emperors during the period of June 1904 to August 1907.

The telegrams start with a plea from Nicholas to Wilhelm to try to stop the serious developments that led up to the World War. An excerpt (29 July 1914, 1 a.m.):

Ultimately, the correspondence changes tone and the two leaders warn each other of impending mobilization due to factors out of their control, while retaining the notion that mobilization does not mean war. An excerpt of the last telegram (1 August 1914):

Representatives of belligerent nations discussed the telegrams during the war, during the Paris Peace Conference, and on into the interwar years, and beyond.  In recent years academic historians have reassessed the exchange. They paid special attention to the telegram of Nicholas dated July 29, 1914, 8:20 p.m.:

In this telegram, on 29 July 1914, Nicholas suggested submitting the Austro-Serbian problem to the Hague Conference (in the Hague tribunal) – Wilhelm did not address this in his subsequent telegram. According to Beck, the German Foreign Office omitted this telegram in publishing the correspondence between Wilhelm and Nicholas. After the publication of this telegram by the Russian government on 31 January 1915 in the Official Gazette Governmental Herald, the German Foreign Office explained that they regarded this telegram as too "unimportant". In contrast, the Russian Foreign Ministry (Minister Sazonov), as well as the French Ambassador in Russia (Maurice Paléologue) believed the telegram was very important. Paléologue, Beck, and some other authors accused Wilhelm in that he had not supported the proposal of Nicholas to submit the Austro-Serbian problem to the Hague Tribunal for adjustment, and thus abandoned the chance for a peaceful resolution to this problem.

A "flurry of telegrams" between Wilhelm and Nicholas led to the cancellation of Russian general mobilization by the latter on 29 July, but under pressure from Sazonov this was resumed two days later, and on 1 August 1914, both Germany and Russia found themselves at war.

Notes and references

External links
 The Willy-Nicky Letters - Full text at www.gwpda.org (World War I Document Archive)
 The Willy-Nicky Telegrams - Full text at the World War I Document Archive

Telegrams
World War I
World War I documents
Correspondences
Germany–Russia relations
Wilhelm II, German Emperor
Nicholas II of Russia
Foreign relations of the Russian Empire
1914 documents